The Fond du Lac Panthers were a Wisconsin State League minor league baseball team that played in Fond du Lac, Wisconsin, from 1940 to 1953.

Notable alumni

Ray Powell (1942)

Harry Rice (1940–1941)
Charley Pride (1953)

References

External links
Baseball Reference

Baseball teams established in 1940
Baseball teams disestablished in 1953
Wisconsin State League teams
Professional baseball teams in Wisconsin
New York Yankees minor league affiliates
Defunct baseball teams in Wisconsin
1940 establishments in Wisconsin
1953 disestablishments in Wisconsin